Yesterday, Today & Tomorrow is a studio album by American hip hop artist K-the-I???. It was originally released through Mush Records on November 4, 2008. In Europe, it was released through Ninja Tune on October 20, 2008. A music video was created for "Lead the Floor".

Production
Having met at the 2006 South by Southwest, K-the-I??? and Thavius Beck remixed each others' songs. Afterward, in order to make the album, K-the-I??? moved from Cambridge, Massachusetts to Los Angeles, California. Entirely produced by Thavius Beck, the album features vocal contributions from Nocando, Thavius Beck, Vyle, Subtitle, High Priest, Busdriver, and Mestizo.

Critical reception

At Metacritic, which assigns a weighted average score out of 100 to reviews from mainstream critics, the album received an average score of 76, based on 8 reviews, indicating "generally favorable reviews."

Andrew Martin of PopMatters gave the album 7 stars out of 10, calling it "another top-notch album in 2008." Brigid Moore of XLR8R gave the album a 6.5 out of 10 and commented that "K-the-I??? has a bright future ahead." Omar Mouallem of Exclaim! praised Thavius Beck's production, stating: "His beats are charged with high-voltage electricity and are as interesting as the words above or below them." Jason Lymangrover of AllMusic gave the album 3 stars out of 5, writing: "Fans of esoteric underground rap should take notice."

Track listing

References

External links
 

2008 albums
Mush Records albums
Ninja Tune albums
Hip hop albums by American artists
Albums produced by Thavius Beck